Masjid Taha, or Taha Mosque (Arabic: مسجد طه) is a mosque in Geylang, Singapore. It is the only mosque for the Ahmadiyya Muslim Community in the country. It is located at Onan Road, adjacent to Masjid Khalid, a mainstream mosque.

Masjid Taha is one of two mosques in Singapore that are not administered by Majlis Ugama Islam Singapura, due to the difference in religious beliefs between the Ahmadiyya Muslim Community and the Singaporean Muslims who are predominantly Sunni of the Shafi'i school of thought.

Transportation
The mosque is accessible from Paya Lebar MRT station.

See also
 Islam in Singapore
 Masjid Temenggong Daeng Ibrahim

References

Taha
Taha